Wahrenholz is a municipality in the district of Gifhorn, in Lower Saxony, Germany. The Municipality Wahrenholz includes the villages of Betzhorn, Teichgut, Wahrenholz, Weißenberge and Weißes Moor.

References

Gifhorn (district)